The Museum of African Culture Is a museum in Newfield, Maine, Maine, United States, that specialized in Sub-Saharan African tribal art and culture. Changing exhibits included art inspired by the African diaspora, and the museum's programs included music, storytelling, films, poetry, literature, healing ceremonies and other Sub-Saharan African cultural traditions.  Collections included wooden masks, figures, textiles, household objects and tools. It is the only museum in northern New England devoted to African arts and culture and has over 4,500 pieces of art

References

External links
https://museumofafricanculture.org

 

1998 establishments in Maine
African art museums in the United States
Art museums established in 1998
Art museums and galleries in Maine

Museums in Portland, Maine
Tribal art